Antoine Adelisse (born 10 June 1996) is a French freestyle skier. He was born in Nantes. 
He competed in slopestyle at the FIS Freestyle World Ski Championships 2013. He represented France at the 2014 Winter Olympics in Sochi, the 2018 Winter Olympics in PyeongChang, and the 2022 Winter Olympics in Beijing.

References

External links 
 

1996 births
Living people
Freestyle skiers at the 2014 Winter Olympics
Freestyle skiers at the 2018 Winter Olympics
Freestyle skiers at the 2022 Winter Olympics
French male freestyle skiers
Olympic freestyle skiers of France
Sportspeople from Nantes